Joshua Mapleston is an Australian writer, comic, and actor. Josh grew up in Brisbane, Queensland. He completed a Bachelor of Arts majoring in Film Production at the Queensland University of Technology.

In 2017 he won an Emmy award for 'Outstanding Writing in Children's Animation' for his work on Beat Bugs. He is also one of the principle writers for the follow-up animated series 'Motown'.

In the comedy sphere he created and wrote the critically acclaimed I Rock, a narrative comedy series about a struggling indie band. He also starred as the band's misanthropic frontman Nash Taylor.

He wrote and script-edited the action-comedy series Maximum Choppage. In the same year he co-created and wrote the popular web series Ultimate Fanj (Working Group/ABC Television Australia) about the lives of hapless hipsters in inner-city Sydney.

His credits also include a number of popular Australian drama series including romantic comedy The Wrong Girl (Playmaker Media) based on the hit novel by Zoe Foster Blake, dramedy House Husbands (Playmaker Media) and the television adaptation of John Marsden's iconic action-adventure novels Tomorrow, When the War Began (Ambience Entertainment).

He has been nominated for two Australian Writers' Guild Awards for his work on young adult drama series Ready For This and the internationally successful Dance Academy. On top of writing duties he was also Dance Academy's Series Script Editor for Seasons 2 and 3. Both shows were nominated for International Emmy Awards for "Best Children's Series".

As a stand-up comic he has been performing in Australia for over ten years.

Other writing credits include:

 Home and Away, 2007–present (12 Episodes)
 Shortland Street, 2007 (1 Episode)
 McLeod's Daughters, 2001

References

External links
 

Australian male soap opera actors
Living people
Year of birth missing (living people)